Sindhi folktales play an important part in the culture of the Sindhi people of southern Pakistan. Pakistan's Sindh province abounds in fairy-tales and folktales that form its folklore. Some of these folktales (قصا) are particularly important for the development of higher literature in Sindhi, since they were to form the core of mystical tales of Sindh immortalized by Shah Abdul Latif Bhittai, and are generally known as Heroines of Shah (شاه جون سورميون).

Many of these folktales, especially those that deal with love stories, are well known in Sindh. Among them, the story of Sassui Punhun is probably the most famous. In it, a beautiful Indus girl named Sassui, brought up by a washerman's family in Bhambore, attracts many lovers. Finally, the prince of Kecch falls in love with her. His family is dismayed and eventually make the couple drunk and carry the lover away. Sassui finds herself alone in the morning. She follows the traces of a Baloch caravan until she perishes in the desert.

There is also the tragic story of Sohni who, married to a man she dislikes. She swims every night across the Indus to visit her beloved Mehar who tends the cattle on an island Eventually her sister-in-law discovers the secret and substitutes a pot of unbaked clay for a pot she used to carry as a kind of life vest, and Sohni drowns.

Strange is the story of Lilan Chanesar. The heroine, a lady well versed in magic charms, barters the right of sleeping one night with her husband to her unknown rival for a diamond necklace. When her husband divorces her, she realizes she has frivolously given away all her happiness. After long trials, the couple meet again and die together.

The story of Nuri tells of historical event during the Samma period, when the young Jam Tamachi fell in love with a fishermaid, Nuri, who, by virtue of humility and softness, became his favourite queen.

The story of Umar Marui is also famous. Umar, the ruler of Amarkot, captures young Marui. She pines and longs for home, never listening to the blandishment of the ruler, but remaining faithful to her family, the poor herdsmen of Malir Tharparkar. Eventually, Umar sees no way but to send her home.

All these stories and many more have been enriched in the course of time and provide imagery for Sindhi literature, especially for the Sufis, who spiritualised the tales.

Stories of Dodo Chanesar and Moriro are full of sentiment of valour. Similarly, Sorath Rai Diyach emphasizes the prowess and generosity of King Diyaach, who severed his head and gave it in alms to a bard, Bijal.
 
Recently, these folktales have been compiled into seven volumes titled Loke Kahaniyun under Sindhi Adabi Board's Folklore and Literature project. These seven volumes incorporate different varieties of folktales, legends and other stories. More than 300 folk-tales have been brought to light through this series of volumes, which includes both classical and popular tales.

See also
Sindhi folklore
Pakistani folklore
Tomb paintings of Sindh

References

External links
Sindhi Folktales
Sindhi Adabi Board

Sindhi folklore
Culture of Sindh
Pakistani folklore